Mira Sorvino (born September 28, 1967) is an American actress. Throughout the course of her career she has been nominated for several awards for her work on film and television, in particular, for her performance in the 1995 comedy film Mighty Aphrodite, directed by Woody Allen, in which she was the nominee of fifteen awards, winning eight in total − namely, the Academy Award for Best Supporting Actress and the Golden Globe Award for Best Supporting Actress – Motion Picture, while she was also nominated for the BAFTA Award for Best Actress in a Supporting Role and the Screen Actors Guild Award for Outstanding Performance by a Female Actor in a Supporting Role.

Academy Awards

Golden Globe Awards

Primetime Emmy Awards

BAFTA Awards

20/20 Awards

Action On Film International Film Festival

Awards Circuit Community

Broadcast Film Critics Association

Canadian International Faith & Family Film Festival

Chicago Film Critics Association

Chlotrudis Society for Independent Film

Dallas–Fort Worth Film Critics Association

Giffoni Film Festival

Gold Derby Awards

Golden Eagle Awards

Golden Raspberry Awards

Hoboken International Film Festival

Los Angeles Film Critics Association

Milano International Film Festival

MTV Movie & TV Awards

National Board of Review

National Society of Film Critics

New York Film Critics Circle

New York VisionFest

Oldenburg International Film Festival

Online Film & Television Association

Prism Awards

San Diego International Film Festival

Saturn Awards

Screen Actors Guild Awards

Sonoma International Film Festival

Southeastern Film Critics Association

Stinkers Bad Movie Awards

Taormina Film Fest

Notes

References

So, Mira